The 1992–93 season was the 52nd season in Albacete Balompié's history.

Squad
Retrieved on 3 February 2021

Transfers

In

Out

Squad stats 
Last updated on 4 February 2021.

|-
|colspan="14"|Players who have left the club after the start of the season:

|}

Competitions

Overall

La Liga

League table

Matches

Relegation playoff

Copa del Rey

References

Albacete Balompié seasons
Albacete Balompié